Rafael Simancas Simancas (born 1966) is a Spanish politician and member of the Spanish Socialist Workers' Party (PSOE). Since 2021, he is the Secretary of State for Relations with the Cortes and Constitutional Affairs. Formerly, he was the Secretary-General of the PSOE Madrid branch.

Biography 
Born on 1 September 1966 in Kehl, West Germany, his parents were immigrants from Córdoba. He graduated in Political Science at the Complutense University of Madrid. He became a member of the Madrid City Council after the 1995 municipal election and renovated his seat in the 1999 election. He served as Secretary-General of the Socialist Party of Madrid from 2000 to 2007, when he was replaced by Tomás Gómez He ran as head of list of the PSOE list in the May 2003, October 2003 and 2007 regional elections. Following his exit from the regional legislature in February 2008, he has been member of the 9th, 10th, 11th and 12th terms of the Congress of Deputies.

In July 2021, Presidency Minister Félix Bolaños appointed him as Secretary of State for Relations with the Cortes and Constitutional Affairs.

References

1966 births
Complutense University of Madrid alumni
Leaders of political parties in Spain
Living people
Spanish Socialist Workers' Party politicians
Madrid city councillors (1999–2003)
Madrid city councillors (1995–1999)
Members of the 6th Assembly of Madrid
Members of the 7th Assembly of Madrid
Members of the 8th Assembly of Madrid
Members of the 9th Congress of Deputies (Spain)
Members of the 10th Congress of Deputies (Spain)
Members of the 11th Congress of Deputies (Spain)
Members of the 12th Congress of Deputies (Spain)
Members of the Socialist Parliamentary Group (Assembly of Madrid)
Members of the 13th Congress of Deputies (Spain)
Members of the 14th Congress of Deputies (Spain)